Tamer Animals is the second album of the American indie rock band Other Lives. "For 12," the album's first single was picked by Thom Yorke for a playlist on Radiohead.com.

References

2011 albums
Other Lives (band) albums
PIAS Recordings albums
TBD Records albums